Noémie Silberer (born 8 January 1991 in Geneva, Switzerland) is a Swiss figure skater who competes in ladies singles. She won the bronze medal at the Swiss Figure Skating Championships in 2008 and 2009 and finished 28th at the European Figure Skating Championships in 2009.

References
 

Swiss female single skaters
Sportspeople from Geneva
1991 births
Living people
21st-century Swiss women